The Loleta Union School District, headquartered in Loleta, California, oversees public education, through grade 8, in a portion of coastal central Humboldt County, California.  The school it operates is the Loleta Elementary School in Loleta. 

The school board consists of five members:
John Simmons
John Oswald
Roseann Millhorn
Glen Shewry

The superintendent is Autumn Chapman.

References

External links
 

School districts in Humboldt County, California